Swingz is South Korean indie rock duo originally formed as a trio in Daegu, South Korea. They were featured in episode "Breaking Down Our Prejudice" of Arirang TV's program "Rock on Korea" in July 2013. In June 2013 Swingz collaborated on stage with another all-female indie rock band Rubber Duckie and formed project group "Walking After U".

Members

Current 
 Haein (guitar, vocals)
 A-hyun (drums)

Former 
 Misun (bass guitar, vocals)

Discography

Albums 
 Beginning Of Swingz, October 2011
 Renewal, September 2012

References

External links 
 Swingz in naver music

South Korean indie rock groups
All-female bands